MS Sherbatskiy was a RORO Passenger and Freight ferry operating services between Almeria and Nador on a time-charter basis to the Spanish ferry operator Acciona Trasmediterranea. The ship was formerly called the M/F Oleander (2001-2013), P&OSL Picardy (1999-2001), Pride of Bruges (1987-1999) and Pride of Free Enterprise (1980-1987). She was operated by FerriMaroc and Comarit between 2010 and 2011 and previously owned and operated by TransEuropa Ferries between Ramsgate and Ostend. TransEuropa Ferries owned the ferry between 2001 and 2013 and operated her between 2001 and 2010 before placing her on charter. She was scrapped at Alang in late 2015 under the name Sher.

History

Pride of Free Enterprise  was built by Schichau Unterweser AG for European Ferries services between Dover and Calais, initially entering service with them in 1980. In 1987 European Ferries was purchased by P&O European Ferries; in the same year her sister ship, Herald of Free Enterprise capsized just outside Zeebrugge. As a result of these two events, Pride of Free Enterprise was renamed Pride of Bruges under a rebranding exercise undertaken by P&O following the bad publicity of the Herald of Free Enterprise disaster.

In 1998 P&O European Ferries merged its Short sea routes with Stena Line to form P&O Stena Line. As a result of this merger the vessels were again rebranded, this time the vessel was renamed to P&OSL Picardy. In 2000 P&OSL Picardy was laid up pending sale, eventually being sold to Transeuropa Ferries.

Transeuropa Ferries renamed the vessel Oleander and introduced a freight only service between Ramsgate and Ostend which began on 4 July 2002. Two years later, on 20 July 2004 Oleander was joined by Larkspur to provide a joint passenger/freight service also operating between the two ports. From 2010 onwards Oleander was often sailing on the Spain - Morocco lines on short term leases from TEF to Comarit or FerriMaroc. When TEF went into bankruptcy in April 2013 the Oleander moved on more permanent basis to Acciona Trasmediterránea and sailed on the Almeria to Nador route as M/F Sherbatskiy. The ship was renamed Sher for her last voyage to the scrapyard at Alang, India and broken up in late 2015.

Sister ships
Spirit of Free Enterprise (1979) - Pride of Kent (1987) - MS Anthi Marina (2006) - scrapped: September 2012.
Herald of Free Enterprise (1979) - capsized 6 March 1987 in Zeebrugge harbour - re-floated, renamed to Flushing Range for the final trip to the scrapyard. Scrapped: 1988

References

Ferries of the United Kingdom
Ferries of France
Ferries of Belgium
Ferries of Morocco
1980 ships
Connections across the English Channel
Transeuropa Ferries